FEF or Fef may refer to:

 Futsal European Federation
 Fef, West Papua, the capital of Tambrauw Regency, West Papua, Western New Guinea
 Ecuadorian Football Federation
 FedExField, a stadium in Landover, Maryland, United States
 Fire Emblem Fates'', a video game
 Forced expiratory flow 
 Frontal eye fields
 Frontier Education Foundation, in Pakistan
 Fusion Energy Foundation, a defunct American think tank 
 Union Pacific FEF Series, a steam locomotive
 First European Farmers